William Charles Richard Wells (1 February 1916 – 27 May 1984) was an Australian rules footballer who played with Richmond in the Victorian Football League (VFL).

Family
The son of former Fitzroy and Richmond footballer Charles "Chinger" Wells (1892–1929), and Fanny Ellen Wells (1892–1971), née Craven, William Charles Richard Wells was born in Richmond on 1 February 1916.

Football
Recruited from the Burnley Football Club, for whom he had played from 1931 to 1933, he spent five seasons with Richmond (1934–1938), during which time he played in 45 Second XVIII games (1934–1938), scoring 16 goals, and in 23 First XVIII games (1934–1938), scoring 2 goals.

Playing at centre half-back, in place of Norm Dickson, and playing against Ron Todd, he was one of the best players in the Richmond side that lost to Collingwood in the 1937 First Semi-Final 10.9 (69) to 18.12 (120).

Notes

Footnotes

References
 Hogan P, The Tigers of Old, Richmond FC, (Melbourne), 1996.

External links 

1916 births
1984 deaths
Australian rules footballers from Melbourne
Richmond Football Club players
People from Richmond, Victoria